Lindsay Davenport was the defending champion, but retired in the second round against Anna-Lena Grönefeld due to a low back strain.

Kim Clijsters won the title, defeating Venus Williams 7–5, 6–2 in the final.

Seeds
The first four seeds received a bye into the second round.

Draw

Finals

Top half

Bottom half

External links
 Main and Qualifying draws

2005 WTA Tour